Skunk oil is an oil that is obtained from the two lateral glands that run the length of a skunk's back.  Skunks store fat in these glands for use during hibernation or semi-hibernation in warmer climates. Skunk oil has minimal odor.

Uses

Skunk oil was used by the Native Americans as a healing balm or liniment.  When rendered from the glands over a low heat, it has the consistency of an SAE10 motor oil and the feel of coal oil when applied to the skin. It gives a warming sensation as a mild liniment would. The early explorers and fur buyers, especially in Canada, found that the oil was a very useful addition to their medical kits and paid the natives a premium price for it.

It is also used in the United States as a way for deer hunters to mask their human odor while hunting.

Production

Around 1900, the state of Maine produced about 25,000 gallons of the oil annually which sold for about $4/gallon.

See also
 Musk

References

Animal fats
Medical treatments
Native American culture
Skunks
Traditional medicine